This is a list of alumni and faculty at the Maharaja Sayajirao University of Baroda.

Alumni

Arts

Social Sciences and Law

Science

Technology

Others

A

 Asha Puthli, producer, recording artist, composer, publisher.
 Ankur Vikal, Indian film and theatre actor.
 Arup Kumar Raychaudhuri, condensed matter physicist, Shanti Swarup Bhatnagar laureate

B
 Bakul Harshadrai Dholakia, former Director of IIM Ahmedabad, a Padma Shri awardee
 Bharati Mukherjee, Bharati Mukherjee, the writer of Immigrant Life.
 Bela Trivedi, Judge, Supreme Court of India.

C
Chintan Upadhyay, an Indian contemporary artist.

D
Deepak Shimkhada, a Nepali American educator, artist, art historian.

E
Esther David is an Indian Jewish author.

G
 Geetanjali Shree, a novelist, short story writer and winner of 2022 International Booker Prize. 
 Gunvant Shah, a noted thinker, writer and columnist.

H
Hasmukh Patel architect credited with making significant contributions .
Prof. (Dr.) Hemlata Talesra, educationalist and activist

K
K. Chidananda Gowda, former Vice-Chancellor of Kuvempu University.
 Kavitha Balakrishnan, an art critic.

L
 Laxma Goud, painter, printmaker and draughtsman.
 Latika Katt, an Indian sculptor.

M
 Mrunalini Devi Puar, Dr Mrunalini Devi Puar, the Chancellor of the Maharaja Sayajirao University of Baroda.

P
 Pramod Kale, a scientist and former Director, Vikram Sarabhai Space Centre.
 Pankaj Advani (director), film-director, film-editor, screenplay-writer, photographer, theater director, and painter.
 Pan Nalin, director, screenwriter and documentary-maker.

R
 Rajendra Shah, lyrical Gujarati poet and philosopher.
 Reetika Khera, economist and teacher.

S
 S. L. Bhyrappa, Kannada novelist and philosopher.
 Shanti Dave, painter and sculptor.
 Srilamanthula Chandramohan, an artist.
 Sosa Joseph, an Indian contemporary artist.
 Salma Arastu, an Indian artist.

T
Thota Vaikuntam, an Indian painter.

V
 Vinoba Bhave, Indian advocate of nonviolence and human rights; "National Teacher of India", spiritual successor of Mahatma Gandhi

 Vihang A. Naik, (b.1969) Indian poet .
 Vivan Sundaram, an Indian contemporary artist.

Notable faculty

References

Maharaja Sayajirao University